The Thomas sea catfish (Notarius grandicassis) is a species of catfish in the family Ariidae. It was described by Achille Valenciennes in 1840, originally under the genus Arius.

The Thomas sea catfish is currently ranked as Least Concern by the IUCN redlist. It spawns during the months of May and June. Its meat is of minor commercial value, and is marketed fresh.

References

Ariidae
Fish described in 1840